City Mine(d)  is a non-profit arts, civil society and urban development organisation. It was set up in 1997 and has since initiated, supported and produced over 100 initiatives in 15 cities throughout Europe. It has active bases in Brussels, Belgium and London, UK.

Before City Mine(d)
City Mine(d) emerged from urban actions aimed at improving the quality of life in Brussels in the 1990s. Reflecting the bilingual nature of Brussels and offering the minimum legal protection required, a number of Stichtingen/Foundations with the life span of a single campaign were set up: 'Stichting/Fondation Pied de Biche Open Deur', 'Stichting/Fondation Legumen' and 'Stichting/Fondation Sens Unique' are but a few examples.

A first attempt to increase impact and sustainability of this circuit of initiatives was VrijstadBXLVilleLibre. However, after a founding meeting and the publication of a newspaper, this network of 'self-determined and self-organising new urban initiatives' only had a short lease of life. According to some involved, the demise was due to a lack of 'a professional back-office'.

City Mine(d) vzw
On 21 August 1997 non-profit association City Mine(d) was set up with as a purpose "the organising of urban, social-artistic projects". It was able to do over 12 projects per year in deprived neighbourhoods of Brussels, ranging from Kureghem, where a football ground was built, to Schaerbeek, where a derelict site became a park, and from ephemeral afternoon events to constructions that lasted several years. Each summer, with Cinema Nova  an open-air cinema tour was organised along 4 neighbourhoods to bring films to "those who can't afford to go on holiday". In addition, City Mine(d) became a node in the network Bunker Souple, a loose-tight connection of artists, activists and architects that wanted to develop their work and the city outside the narrow remit of institutionalised cultural production.

Precare
In 1999 now defunct Precare  was set up to facilitate the temporary use of urban derelict buildings. By temporary using empty spaces, artists and creators could start their career at very low cost, while previously abandoned buildings became used again. Notable projects Precare was involved in are Cinema Nova and Bains Connective.

Brussels 2000
When, in 2000, Brussels was one of Europe's Capitals of Culture, City Mine(d) worked to have 'informal culture' involved in its programme. With two large scale interventions - Limite Limite and Bara-ke - and a series of networking initiatives - like Bunker Souple Repertorium- it tried to give the passing glory of a cultural capital a more lasting impact. Limite Limite  went on to win the prestigious "Thuis in de Stad Award" for innovative urban renewal from the regional government, while Benjamin Verdonck  won wide acclaim with Bara-ke. Also in 2000, City Mine(d)'s work featured in the major millennium exhibition Mutations in Bordeaux' Arc en Rêve Centre d'Architecture, commissioned by Stefano Boeri and as part of the Uncertain States of Europe network.  
During the EU Summit of 2001, City Mine(d) was heavily involved in the occupation of the Luxemburg station in Brussels. Bruxxel free zone provided an alternative for creativity and debate amidst the increasing antagonising between politicians and anti-global campaigners.

Bruxel Glocal
From 2003 on City Mine(d) widened its horizons by setting up offices in Barcelona (Spain) and London (UK). After publishing their own road maps to the city - The Networkbook for urban p/arts in London and Tallermapas in Barcelona - local initiatives further developed in all 3 cities. The Bruxel glocal conference in Brussels' Bozar in February 2003, with contributions by Josep Acebillo, Patsy Healey and others was an attempt to bring artists, activists and researchers from Europe together to think and talk about bottom-up initiatives in a globalising context.

Since 2010

Prototypes
More recently City Mine(d) has focused on the creation of prototypes. The prototype aims to provide a tangible and practical answer to a topical social question. The development of prototypes follows a seven-step procedure  that aims to ensure the result is delivered at the end, and to guarantee the involvement of a diverse group of partners.

Topical questions deal with urban sustainability issues. In the past, questions dealt with revolved around water in the city [properwater 2011-2014] 
, the labour market [Micronomics 2007-2010] bottom up regeneration plans [can ricart 2004 -2006]

The creation of a prototype is the motive for bringing together a diverse group of people. City Mine(d) refers to this group as “a coalition”. The practical focus on realising the prototype involves individuals from different backgrounds, interests or convictions who would otherwise never sit together. In the course of the project, the “coalition” becomes a place where these different people develop a common understanding of a topical issue; a forum where other related issues can also be raised; and a group that from the shared experience can take a common position in public or political debate.

City Mine(d) LAB
In an attempt to link experienced and scientific knowledge, to mobilise the knowledge built in the streets and allow this grassroots knowledge to be unlocked in universities, and conversely allow the knowledge universities develop to seep through to activism and grass roots activities, City Mine(d) set up City Mine(d) LAB, an interface between academia and activism/the field/grass roots initiatives. Tangible outcomes are collaborations in EU research on Social innovation - Singocom (2001-2004) - social exclusion - Katarsis (2006-2009). - Social Cohesion - Social Polis (2008-2010) and on Co-creation in the Co-creation network (2017-2021).

Current projects

La Pile
Exploring the room for agency of citizens in the vast sector of electricity, City Mine(d) is working on La Pile in the Brussels neighbourhood of St-Gilles until 2021

Elephant Path
In the Kings Cross area of London, Elephant Path tried to find out if residents' interest in food, their skills and their talents could become a way of topping up their income. The project ran until 2021.

Bibliography
 Awan, N., Schneider, Y. & Till J. (2011), « Spatial Agency. Other ways of doing architecture », Routledge London, New York USA
 Messner, B., Wrentschur, M. (2011), « Initiative Soziokultur. Diskurse. Konzepte. Praxis », LIT Verlag, Graz, Wien, London, Berlin
 Doucet, I. (2008), « Planning in Search of Ground: Committed Muddling Through or a Critical View form Above?» in The Territorial Future of the City, ed. Giovanni Maciocco, Springer, New York USA
 Amon, M., Arher K., Bosman M. (2006), «Relocating Global Cities: from the center to the margins», Rowman & Littlefield Publishers, Maryland USA
 Inura, (2004), « The contested Metropolis», Birkhäuser, Basel
 Iacovoni, A. (2003), « Game zone, Playgrounds between virtual scenarios and reality », Birkhäuser, Basel
 City Mine(d) (1998) Repertorium, Brussel
 City Mine(d) (2000) Repertorium 2000, Brussel
 City Mine(d) (2004) Networkbook for Urban P/arts: 42 Initiatives Capturing London's Public Space City Mine(d), London
 City Mine(d) (2006) « Generalized Empowerment. Uneven Development and Urban Interventions », Brussel (B), City Mine(d)
 City Mine(d) (2013) « Eau Propre | Proper Water », Brussel (B), City Mine(d)
 City Mine(d) (2017) « The Future of Work in the Collaborative City » 
 City Mine(d) (2018), « An Urban Future beyond the Labour Market »
 City Mine(d) (2018), « Rio de Janeiro, 26 Oct 2018 »

References

External links
Groundswellcollective.com 
Eukn.org
Openplaces.euwww.citymined.org
BBC News on the PingPongProject
Spatial Agency
Icon Magazine Manifesto

Community organizations
Organisations based in Brussels